Christina "Christy" Renée Henrich (July 18, 1972 – July 26, 1994) was an American artistic gymnast. Her death from anorexia nervosa at age 22 led to major reforms in the way women's gymnastics is covered on television and in the news media. She was coached by Al Fong.

Early career
Training with Al Fong at the Great American Gymnastics Express (GAGE) club in Blue Springs, Missouri, Henrich made the U.S. national gymnastics team in 1986 after placing fifth all-around in the junior division at the U.S. National Championships.
She continued to climb through the elite ranks over the next four years, placing ninth at the 1988 Olympic Trials, and winning the silver medal in the all-around at the 1989 U.S. National Championships.

She represented the United States at the 1989 World Championships in Stuttgart, placing fourth with the American team, and just missing a medal in the uneven bars final. One of Henrich's original balance beam leaps was named after her in the Code of Points; as of 2007, the skill is still included in the Code, and carries a 'C' difficulty rating.

Weight issues
Though Henrich was succeeding in gymnastics, a judge at an international meet in 1989 told her bluntly that she was fat and needed to lose weight. The perception of Henrich's weight being too high was fueled further by the culture of elite gymnastics, which was dominated by "pixies"—small, underweight, prepubescent girls. Her own coach, Al Fong—coach of the late Julissa Gomez, who also reportedly felt pushed into doing something unsafe when she kept attempting the difficult-to-master Yurchenko vault until she was rendered quadriplegic in a vaulting accident—had also allegedly made insulting remarks about her size and body type. Desperate to move up the ranks in the highly competitive world of Olympic-level gymnastics, Henrich took the criticisms to heart; her drive to lose a few pounds progressed to disordered eating habits and, eventually, the development of anorexia nervosa.

At first, neither her family nor her coaches were aware of the situation. Eventually, her battle with anorexia took such a toll on her health that she was no longer strong enough to compete, and she was asked to leave GAGE. Despite many early treatments and hospitalizations, her weight deteriorated to 47 pounds (21 kg). Henrich died of multiple organ failure on July 26, 1994.

Aftermath
Henrich's death brought the problem of eating disorders in women's gymnastics into the spotlight. Gymnasts such as Kathy Johnson and Cathy Rigby admitted to having periods of disordered eating that resembled anorexia and bulimia; and other U.S. National Team gymnasts stepped forward and went public about their own eating disorders and disordered eating.

The focus on gymnast wellness was addressed with several programs on both the national and international levels, such as educational videos, nutrition counseling and classes, to varying degrees of success.

Additionally, American television channels broadcasting gymnastics competitions, such as NBC-TV and ABC-TV, stopped commenting about or listing gymnasts' weights in captions in the mid-1990s. Television stations from other nations have adopted similar policies.

See also
 Little Girls in Pretty Boxes, a book about the hard lives of female gymnasts and figure skaters
 Julissa Gomez, an American gymnast paralyzed in a vaulting accident at a 1988 meet in Japan while attempting the difficult-to-master Yurchenko vault
 Elena Mukhina, a Soviet gymnast paralyzed in a tumbling accident in 1980 while attempting the now-banned Thomas salto
 List of deaths from anorexia nervosa

References

External links
 Christy Henrich Tribute & Resources @ Eating Disorder Resources wiki
 Al Fong, Henrich's coach, featured in an article about Olympic gymnastics on espn.com

1972 births
1994 deaths
Sportspeople from Independence, Missouri
American female artistic gymnasts
Neurological disease deaths in the United States
Deaths from anorexia nervosa
Originators of elements in artistic gymnastics
20th-century American women
20th-century American people